Ghuran Ram is an Indian politician. He was elected to the Lok Sabha, lower house of the Parliament of India from Palamu, Jharkhand as a member of the Rashtriya Janata Dal in a bye election.

References

Rashtriya Janata Dal politicians
Lok Sabha members from Bihar
1970 births
India MPs 2004–2009
Living people